The 2002 NBA Finals was the National Basketball Association (NBA)'s championship series for the 2001–02 season. The best-of-seven playoff was contested between the Western Conference champion Los Angeles Lakers (who were also two-time defending NBA champions), and the Eastern Conference champion New Jersey Nets. The Lakers swept the Nets, four games to none, to win the franchise's 14th NBA championship and third consecutive NBA championship. The 56th edition of the championship series was played between June 5 and June 12 and was broadcast on NBC — the last NBA games broadcast on the network to date.

Shaquille O'Neal, who averaged 36 points and 12 rebounds in the Finals, was named the NBA Finals Most Valuable Player. Lakers coach Phil Jackson won his ninth ring, tying him with Red Auerbach for most all-time. During the series, he surpassed Pat Riley for most career playoffs wins with 156.

Background

Road to the Finals

Regular season series
The Los Angeles Lakers and New Jersey Nets split both games in the regular season, each winning on their home court.

New Jersey Nets

Entering the 2001–02 season, the New Jersey Nets were enduring a three-year playoff drought and had a 73–141 record over that span. In 1999, the Nets hired Rod Thorn as team president and immediately, he hired the recently retired Byron Scott to coach New Jersey. Thorn then dealt for Stephon Marbury in a three-team trade with the Milwaukee Bucks and Minnesota Timberwolves, trading Sam Cassell away to the Bucks. Due to the Nets' 31–51 season in 1999–2000 season, they had the first overall pick in the 2000 NBA draft, which they used to select power forward Kenyon Martin out of the University of Cincinnati. Despite the reshuffling of the roster and a Rookie of the Year season for Martin, New Jersey struggled, ending the season with a 26–56 record, and owned the 7th pick in the upcoming draft.

With another lottery pick, Thorn dealt it to the Houston Rockets for draftees Richard Jefferson, Jason Collins and Brandon Armstrong. The next day, Phoenix Suns owner Jerry Colangelo announced a franchise-shaking trade; Phoenix would swap their point guard Jason Kidd for his New Jersey counterpart Stephon Marbury.

With the Princeton offense installed from the coaching staff, the Nets rebounded to a 52–30 mark, a twenty-six-win improvement from the last season, and clinched the number-one seed in the Eastern Conference. Kidd finished the season awarded with first team spots on both the All-NBA and All-Defensive Teams and was selected for his fifth All-Star game. He also finished runner-up to San Antonio Spurs power forward Tim Duncan in the Most Valuable Player voting. Richard Jefferson was an All-Rookie second team selection and Thorn, the architect of the franchise's resurgence, was awarded NBA Executive of the Year.

In the first round of the playoffs, New Jersey survived a scare against the Indiana Pacers, escaping game five in double overtime to advance. It was the Nets' first playoff series win since 1984. They then dismissed the Charlotte Hornets in five games before meeting their Atlantic Division rivals, the Boston Celtics, in the Conference Finals. The Nets and Celtics split the first two games in New Jersey before moving to Boston. In Game 3, the Nets were dominating the Celtics, leading by as much as 21 in the fourth quarter. However, Boston, led by small forward Paul Pierce, then proceeded to outscore New Jersey 41–16 in the final period, rallying to win 94 to 90. Pierce himself scored 19 points, more than the Nets combined in the fourth, to complete the greatest fourth-quarter comeback in NBA playoff history.

The Nets rebounded in a 94–92 Game 4 victory, that saw another Boston comeback, albeit one that fell short because Pierce missed crucial free throws late. New Jersey then took control of the series and won the next two games in large fashion to finish off Boston in six games, earning the franchise's first NBA Finals appearance and becoming the third former American Basketball Association (ABA) team to make the Finals (the Spurs and the Pacers being the first two). With averages of 17.5 points, 11.2 rebounds, and 10.2 assists per game during the six-game Conference Finals, Kidd become only the fourth player in NBA history to average a triple-double over a course of a series and the second to have at least three.

Los Angeles Lakers

In stark contrast to New Jersey, the Los Angeles Lakers entered the season with high expectations, having won the last two NBA championships. In addition, Los Angeles was coming off of a 15–1 ( winning percentage) run through the 2001 NBA Playoffs, the greatest in NBA history, besting the 1983 Philadelphia 76ers' 12–1 run and were the first team to go undefeated on the road in the playoffs. Since Phil Jackson had arrived to coach the Lakers in 1999, they had a 123–41 mark in the regular season and a 28–9 record in the postseason.

Amid tensions between co-captains Shaquille O'Neal and Kobe Bryant, the franchise had another stellar season, finishing 58–24, good for second in the Pacific Division and earning the third seed in the Western Conference. Bryant and O'Neal were voted starters in the 2002 NBA All-Star Game, where Bryant won the game MVP trophy in his hometown Philadelphia. The duo appeared on the All-NBA First Team and Bryant was honored with a Second-Team All-Defensive Team selection.

The Lakers shot out to another quick start in the playoffs, finishing the Portland Trail Blazers in three games with a Robert Horry game-winner. The San Antonio Spurs were dispatched in five games before Los Angeles met their biggest challenge in the duration of their championship reign in the Western Conference Finals: the Sacramento Kings. With the best record in the West, the Kings held home court advantage against the Lakers and split the first two games in ARCO Arena before the series shifted to Staples Center, where Sacramento blew out Los Angeles in Game 3 and led as much as 27 before settling with a 103–90 decision.

Game 4 did not give the Lakers any more hope, as Sacramento led Los Angeles 40–20 at the end of the first quarter and held a lead as large as 26. But, the Lakers staged a furious second-half comeback to win 100–99, punctuated by Horry's buzzer-beating three-point shot. Back in Sacramento for Game 5, the Kings staged some late-game heroics of their own as Mike Bibby nailed a jumper with 8.2 seconds remaining, giving his team not only a 92–91 win, but a 3–2 series advantage.

With their season on the line, the Lakers returned home for Game 6. In a controversial contest, one in which the Lakers attempted 27 free throws in the fourth quarter to Sacramento's 9, O'Neal had one of the most dominant performances of his career with 41 points and 17 rebounds to force a Game 7 in ARCO Arena. The outrage was such that politician Ralph Nader demanded an investigation. In Game 7, the Lakers prevailed in overtime 112–106 to earn their third straight NBA Finals berth.

Rosters

Los Angeles Lakers

New Jersey Nets

Series summary

Game summaries
All times listed below are Eastern Daylight Time. If the venue is located in a different time zone, the local time is also given.

Game 1

Los Angeles's Staples Center sold out for the inaugural game of the 2002 NBA Finals, with nearly 19,000 on hand. The Nets trotted out a lineup of Jason Kidd, Kerry Kittles, Kenyon Martin, Keith Van Horn, and Todd MacCulloch to hold up against the two-time defending and heavily favored champions. The Lakers brought out Derek Fisher, Rick Fox, Shaquille O'Neal, Robert Horry, and Kobe Bryant, who drew the assignment of guarding Kidd. New Jersey head coach Byron Scott, a member of the Showtime Lakers, received a standing ovation.

Taking advantage of a late arrival to the arena by New Jersey, L.A. dominated the first 17 minutes of play with a 42–19 score by the 6:41 mark in the second quarter. From that point on, the Nets went on a 17–6 run to close the lead to a respectable 12. They had no answer for O'Neal, however, who had bullied MacCulloch into 16 points and 6 rebounds by half-time. The Nets outscored the Lakers in the third but stood steadfast as Bryant scored 11 of his 22 in the third.

New Jersey battled back, coming as close as three several times in the final quarter. Desperate to take the lead, they utilized the "Hack-a-Shaq" strategy midway in the fourth. It backfired, as O'Neal was 5–8 from the free throw line and had 16 points and 9 rebounds in the period alone.

New Jersey was doomed by their late start and poor shooting. The Nets, who shot 45% from the field and 74% on free throws were 39% and 57% respectively. Kidd finished with a triple-double, the 26th in Finals history and the first since Charles Barkley's in the 1993 series.

Game 2

Game 3

Game 4

Player statistics

Los Angeles Lakers

|-
| align="left" |  || 4 || 4 || 43.8 || .514 || .545 || .806 || 5.8 || 5.3 || 1.5 || 0.8 || 26.8 
|-
| align="left" |  || 4 || 4 || 33.0 || .515 || .667 || .643 || 3.5 || 3.8 || 0.3 || 0.0 || 12.8 
|-
| align="left" |  || 4 || 4 || 36.0 || .522 || .455 || .833 || 6.3 || 3.5 || 1.5 || 0.5 || 9.8 
|-
| align="left" |  || 4 || 0 || 18.0 || .435 || .600 || 1.000 || 4.8 || 0.0 || 0.3 || 0.5 || 6.5 
|-
| align="left" |  || 4 || 4 || 39.8 || .458 || .455 || .833 || 7.3 || 4.3 || 2.8 || 1.8 || 8.0 
|-
| align="left" |  || 3 || 0 || 3.7 || .200 || .000 || .000 || 0.3 || 0.0 || 0.0 || 0.0 || 0.7 
|-
| align="left" |  || 1 || 0 || 2.0 || .000 || .000 || .000 || 0.0 || 0.0 || 0.0 || 0.0 || 0.0
|-
| align="left" |  || 2 || 0 || 4.5 || 1.000 || .000 || .000 || 0.5 || 0.0 || 0.0 || 0.0 || 1.0 
|-! style="background:#FDE910;"
| align="left" |  || 4 || 4 || 41.5 || .595 || .000 || .662|| 12.3 || 3.8 || 0.5 || 2.8 || 36.3 
|-
| align="left" |  || 1 || 0 || 1.0 || 1.000 || .000 || .000 || 0.0 || 0.0 || 0.0 || 0.0 || 2.0
|-
| align="left" |  || 4 || 0 || 16.3 || .286 || .222 || .000 || 1.8 || 2.5 || 0.3 || 0.5 || 3.5 
|-
| align="left" |  || 4 || 0 || 6.0 || .250 || .000 || 1.000|| 2.0 || 0.0 || 0.0 || 0.3 || 1.0 

New Jersey Nets

|-
| align="left" |  || 4 || 0 || 18.8 || .500 || .000 || .875 || 2.5 || 0.3 || 0.3 || 0.5 || 4.3 
|-
| align="left" |  || 4 || 0 || 22.8 || .344 || .200 || .800 || 2.8 || 2.0 || 1.0 || 0.0 || 7.8 
|-
| align="left" |  || 4 || 0 || 24.3 || .524 || .000 || .455 || 4.5 || 1.3 || 1.0 || 0.0 || 6.8 
|-
| align="left" |  || 4 || 0 || 5.3 || .333 || .000 || .500 || 0.5 || 0.3 || 0.0 || 0.0 || 1.3 
|-
| align="left" |  || 4 || 4 || 42.0 || .438 || .300 || .636 || 7.3 || 9.8 || 2.3 || 0.8 || 20.8 
|-
| align="left" |  || 4 || 4 || 26.5 || .452 || .313 || .700 || 2.0 || 2.5 || 1.5 || 0.5 || 12.5 
|-
| align="left" |  || 4 || 4 || 18.5 || .500 || .000 || 0.5 || 5.0 || 0.5 || 0.8 || 1.0 || 7.5 
|-
| align="left" |  || 2 || 0 || 1.0 || .000 || .000 || .000 || 0.0 || 0.0 || 0.0 || 0.0 || 0.0
|-
| align="left" |  || 4 || 4 || 39.5 || .467 || .200 || .654 || 6.5 || 2.5 || 1.5 || 1.0 || 22.0 
|-
| align="left" |  || 1 || 0 || 1.0 || .000 || .000 || .000 || 0.0 || 0.0 || 0.0 || 0.0 || 0.0
|-
| align="left" |  || 4 || 4 || 30.3 || .386 || .417 || .750 || 5.8 || 2.3 || 0.5 || 0.3 || 10.5 
|-
| align="left" |  || 4 || 0 || 11.5 || .375 || .000 || 1.000 || 2.3 || 0.3 || 0.8 || 0.5 || 3.5

Media coverage
The Finals were produced and televised in the United States by NBC. Marv Albert provided play-by-play calling. Basketball Hall of Famer Bill Walton and Steve "Snapper" Jones handled color duties. Jim Gray and Lewis Johnson roamed the sidelines for the Lakers and Nets respectively. Bob Costas hosted pregame and half-time shows with analyst Tom Tolbert. Brent Musburger and Jack Ramsay called the four games on ESPN Radio. Hannah Storm hosted the post-game show.

The finals also had Spanish-language television and radio broadcasts in the United States.

As previously mentioned, this series was the last broadcast by NBC. In January 2002, the league's broadcast rights were awarded to ABC/ESPN in a six-year deal, which was renewed for an additional eight years in 2007.

At the conclusion of Game 4, NBC presented highlights of the twelve years of their NBA broadcasts; among them the Chicago Bulls' dynasty led by Michael Jordan and Scottie Pippen, the retirements of Larry Bird and Magic Johnson and the Los Angeles Lakers' current Shaq/Kobe reign, as the credits rolled. NBC also played "Winning It All" by The Outfield, which they had used for the close of their NBA Finals broadcasts from 1992 to 1996. The last image displayed was of an empty gym, showing a basketball bouncing into the background, as "To The Flemish Cap" from the soundtrack to the film The Perfect Storm played. NBC ended the broadcast (and their 12-year run broadcasting NBA basketball) by displaying over the shot the message "Thanks for the memories".

The 2002 Finals was also Marv Albert's last NBA Finals assignment. After the series, Albert's national TV duties continued with TNT and remained with the network until his retirement in 2021, but only called games until the Conference Finals each season.

Will Lyman narrated the season-ending documentary for NBA Entertainment.

2002 NBA Finals Ratings

Impact and aftermath

Lakers
The Lakers victory in this year's Finals would also mark the beginning of what would become a successful year for professional sports teams in the Los Angeles metropolitan area. The nearby Anaheim Angels would later claim their first World Series championship four months later. It marked the second occurrence that a city/metropolitan area won both NBA and Major League Baseball championships in the same calendar year. The last time this occurred was in 1988, when the Lakers won that year's NBA Finals in June; the Dodgers followed suit with a World Series victory four months later. In relation to sports of smaller leagues, the Los Angeles Sparks won the WNBA Finals two months after the Lakers' 2002 Finals victory; the Los Angeles Galaxy won the MLS Cup exactly one week prior to the Angels' World Series victory in October. The successes of Los Angeles area teams led Sporting News magazine to declare Anaheim/Los Angeles as "Best Sports City" in 2003. , the Lakers are the last team to pull off a 'three-peat' in North American professional sports. No other team won a "three-peat" since this year's Finals. Since then, only two teams are close to doing so, the Miami Heat and the Golden State Warriors. Whereas the Heat, led by the Big Three of LeBron James, Dwyane Wade, and Chris Bosh, made four consecutive NBA Finals appearances since 2011, won back-to-back titles in 2012 and 2013 against different teams (Oklahoma City Thunder in 2012 and San Antonio Spurs in 2013), but lost in 2014 to the Spurs, the Warriors, led by the Splash Brothers (Stephen Curry and Klay Thompson), Draymond Green, Andre Iguodala, and Kevin Durant, won back-to-back titles in 2017 and 2018 against the Cleveland Cavaliers, but ended their 3-peat journey in 2019 as they fell to the Toronto Raptors in six games.

The Lakers were off to a slow start in the 2002–03 NBA season. By this time, the relationship between Kobe Bryant and Shaquille O'Neal began to show cracks. Injuries were also starting to slow the Lakers down. Nevertheless, the Lakers won 50 games, but would only earn the fifth seed, thereby not earning the home-court advantage. Still, the Lakers took down the fourth-seeded Minnesota Timberwolves in six games. However, they were eliminated by the San Antonio Spurs, who finally earned revenge after their previous two defeats to the Lakers in the 2001 and 2002 NBA playoffs. In Game 5, Robert Horry, a perennial clutch threat in the playoffs, missed a game-winning three that would've given the Lakers a 3-2 lead. The miss eventually led to Horry's free-agent defection to the Spurs the following season.

Nets
The Nets made it back to the Finals in 2003. They won 49 games and the Atlantic Division title, and heading into the Finals they won ten straight games, two in the six-game first round win over the Milwaukee Bucks, and two four-game sweeps of the Boston Celtics and Detroit Pistons. However, they still came up short, losing in six games to the Spurs, in the first NBA finals series featuring former ABA teams.

References

External links

: NBA Encyclopedia article about 2002 Finals

National Basketball Association Finals
Finals
NBA
NBA
NBA Finals
NBA Finals
NBA Finals
Sports competitions in East Rutherford, New Jersey
NBA Finals
Basketball competitions in Los Angeles
21st century in East Rutherford, New Jersey
Meadowlands Sports Complex
Basketball competitions in New Jersey